Arena Naucalpan is an indoor sports arena located in Naucalpan de Juárez, Mexico located on Calle Jardín 19, Naucalpan Centro. The arena is primarily used for professional wrestling, or lucha libre, mainly shows promoted by International Wrestling Revolution Group (IWRG) but has also hosted a number of other promotions since its creation in 1977. Arena Naucalpan has a capacity of 2,400 spectators and is generally configured for professional wrestling with a ring permanently in the center of the arena.

in 1977 the arena replaced Arena KO Al Gusto that was in the same location, when professional wrestling promoter Adolfo Moreno bought the location and had the old roller rink building turned into Arena Naucalpan. From 1977 through 1995 the arena was the center of Promociones Moreno and from 1996 on the home of International Wrestling Revolution Group, the promotion founded by Moreno. When Adolfo Moreno died in 2007 Moreno's sons César and Marco Moreno took ownership of the arena as well as control of IWRG.

The arena hosts the majority of IWRG's shows and all of the promotion's major shows such as the IWRG Anniversary Shows as well as the Arena Naucalpan Anniversary Shows, held each December around December 21.

History
The location at Calle Jardín 19, Naucalpan Centro, 53000 Naucalpan de Juárez, México, Mexico was originally an indoor roller rink for the locals in the late part of the 1950s known as Cafe Algusto. By the early-1960s the building was sold and turned into "Arena KO Al Gusto" and became a local lucha libre or professional wrestling arena, with a ring permanently set up in the center of the building. Promoter Adolfo Moreno began holding shows on a regular basis from the late 1960s, working with various Mexican promotions such as Empresa Mexicana de Lucha Libre (EMLL) to bring lucha libre to Naucalpan. The earliest match reports from Arena KO Al Gusto are dated December 12, 1962 with a main event battle royal that featured wrestler-turned-promoter Adolfo Moreno as one of the participants. By the mid-1970s the existing building was so run down that it was no longer suitable for hosting any events. Moreno bought the old build and had it demolished, building Arena Naucalpan on the same location, becoming the permanent home of Promociones Moreno.

Arena Naucalpan opened its doors for the first lucha libre show on December 17, 1977. From that point on the arena hosted regular weekly shows for Promociones Moreno and also hosted EMLL and later  Universal Wrestling Association (UWA) on a regular basis. In the 1990s the UWA folded and Promociones Moreno worked primarily with EMLL, now rebranded as Consejo Mundial de Lucha Libre (CMLL). From the mid-1990s Moreno would promote several Naucalpan championships, including the Naucalpan Tag Team Championship, Naucalpan Middleweight Championship and the Naucalpan Welterweight Championship, all sanctioned by the local boxing and wrestling commission.

In late 1995 Adolfo Moreno decided to create his own promotion, creating a regular roster instead of relying totally on wrestlers from other promotions, creating the International Wrestling Revolution Group (IWRG; sometimes referred to as Grupo Internacional Revolución in Spanish) on January 1, 1996. From that point on Arena Naucalpan became the main venue for IWRG, hosting the majority of their weekly shows and all of their major shows as well. With the creation of the IWRG Moreno abandoned the Naucalpan championships, instead introducing a series of IWRG branded championships, starting with the IWRG Intercontinental Middleweight Championship created on July 27, 1997, followed by the IWRG Intercontinental Heavyweight Championship two months later. IWRG also kept promoting the Distrito Federal Trios Championship, the only championship predating the foundation of the IWRG.

In 2007 Adolfo Moreno died, leaving his sons César and Marco Moreno to take ownership of both International Wrestling Revolution Group as well as Arena Naucalpan.

Present operations
Arena Naucalpan is permanently set up for lucha libre events, usually hosting IWRG shows on Wednesday and Sunday nights and on occasion hosting shows for other promotions including regular stops by IWRG-partner promotion Lucha Libre AAA World Wide (AAA) as well as shows for various Mexican independent circuit promotion. In its current configuration the arena has a maximum capacity of 2,400 spectators.

Each year IWRG celebrates the anniversary of Arena Naucalpan's opening with their Fiesta Aniversario, the only recurring show series that actually predates the foundation of the IWRG. The anniversary is held on the Sunday or Wednesday in December closest to the 17th. Throughout the year Arena Naucalpan hosts all of IWRG's major event, starting with the IWRG Anniversary Shows, normally celebrated on the first IWRG show of the year, commemorating the January 1, 1996 date IWRG was founded. Other regular shows held throughout the year includes the annual IWRG El Protector tournament, La Guerra de Familias ("War of the Families"), Rebelión de los Juniors ("The Junior Rebellion"), Guerra del Golfo ("Gulf War"), Rey del Ring ("King of the Ring"), Legado Final ("Final Legacy"), Festival de las Máscaras ("Festival of the mask), La Gran Cruzada ("The Great Crusade"), Caravana de Campeones ("Caravan of Champions"), Prison Fatal ("Deadly Prison"), and El Castillo del Terror ("The Tower of Terror").

Arena Naucalpan Anniversary Shows

References

Indoor arenas in Mexico
International Wrestling Revolution Group
Sports venues in Mexico
1977 establishments in Mexico
Buildings and structures completed in 1977
Naucalpan de Juárez